Kerry Lauren Fox (born 30 July 1966) is a New Zealand actress. She came to prominence playing author Janet Frame in the movie An Angel at My Table directed by Jane Campion, which gained her a Best Actress Award from the New Zealand Film and Television Awards.

Early life 
Fox was born in Lower Hutt, Wellington. She graduated from Toi Whakaari: New Zealand Drama School in 1987 with a Diploma in Acting.

Career 
Fox has had an international career, working in independent films and on television. She received praise and a nomination for the Australian Film Institute Awards for her leading role in Country Life, starred in Danny Boyle's breakout British hit Shallow Grave, and was nominated for the Canadian Genie Award for her supporting role in The Hanging Garden.

For her role as Claire in Intimacy (2001), directed by Patrice Chéreau, she won the Silver Bear for Best Actress at the Berlin Film Festival. In this film she performed real, rather than simulated, fellatio. Her husband, Alexander Linklater, wrote about the experience of watching her perform this act on another man.

In autumn 2009 she appeared alongside John Simm, Lucy Cohu and Ian Hart in the Duke of York's Theatre production of Andrew Bovell's play Speaking In Tongues. In 2011 she played Oriel Lamb in the television adaptation of Tim Winton's novel Cloudstreet.

Personal life
Fox is married to journalist Alexander Linklater.  They have two sons.

Filmography

Film

Television

References

External links

Fox interview about Intimacy
Fox interview about Black and White
 Alexander Linklater's reflections, "Dangerous liaisons", in The Guardian (Friday 22 June 2001)

1966 births
Living people
New Zealand film actresses
Toi Whakaari alumni
Silver Bear for Best Actress winners
New Zealand television actresses
20th-century New Zealand actresses
21st-century New Zealand actresses
Actresses from Wellington City